Louis Lorenzo Redding (October 25, 1901 – September 28, 1998) was a prominent lawyer and civil rights advocate from Wilmington, Delaware.  Redding, the first African American to be admitted to the Delaware bar, was part of the NAACP legal team that challenged school segregation in the Brown v. Board of Education case in front of the U.S. Supreme Court. He was 96 when he died at a hospital in Lima, Pa.

Background
Louis Redding was born in Alexandria, Virginia to parents Lewis Alfred Redding and Mary Ann (Holmes) Redding, but moved to Wilmington, Delaware during his childhood. The Redding family resided at 203 East 10th Street in the heart of Wilmington's African-American community.  Redding attended segregated public schools and graduated from Howard High School (the only high school for African Americans in the state at the time) in 1919.  He subsequently enrolled at Brown University and won the Gaston Prize Medal Contest in oratory his senior year for a talk on Booker T. Washington. He graduated from Brown with honors in 1923.  After college, Redding became vice principal of Fessenden Academy in Ocala, Florida and later taught at Morehouse College in Atlanta, Georgia.  In 1925, Redding entered Harvard Law School.  He was the only African-American in Harvard Law's 1928 graduating class.  Redding was admitted to the Delaware bar in the following year.

In 2009, the Redding House Foundation opened the Redding House Museum in his childhood home in Wilmington.

Career

Redding began practicing law in Delaware in 1929, becoming the first African American lawyer in Delaware.  He remained the sole non-white lawyer for more than 25 years. Redding handled cases that successfully challenged discrimination in housing, public accommodations, employment, and the criminal justice system.

Redding represented the plaintiffs in several Delaware cases that challenged segregation in Delaware.  In 1950, he brought a case before the Chancery Court against the University of Delaware, which barred black students from admission, citing the "separate but equal" doctrine. Parker v. the University of Delaware was decided for the plaintiffs, thereby requiring the University to admit black students. It was the first state-funded undergraduate institution to desegregate by court order.

In 1952, Redding brought two cases to desegregate public schools in Claymont (Belton v. Gephart)  and Hockessin (Bulah v. Gephart). Gebhart v. Belton was combined with cases from three other states and the District of Columbia to become part of the landmark U.S. Supreme Court case in 1954 known as Brown v. Board of Education. Redding argued the Brown case with a team of attorneys that included Thurgood Marshall.  Redding also successfully argued Burton v. Wilmington Parking Authority before the US Supreme Court in 1961 which held that segregation in public accommodations was not permissible.

He practiced law for 57 years, opening doors to education and accommodations for many in Delaware and the nation. After his death in 1998, the University of Delaware established the Louis L. Redding Chair for the Study of Law and Public Policy. A residence hall (opened in 2013) at the University of Delaware's Newark Campus was named after him. In 2016, an historic marker was unveiled for Louis L. Redding to educate future generations about his legacy and modern relevance.

Personal
Louis Redding was the eldest of seven children. Redding's brother, J. Saunders Redding, was a noted author and college professor. His sisters Lillian Redding Bailey and C. Gwendolyn Redding were teachers in the Wilmington School System. Two of his siblings, Joseph and Hattie, died in childhood and another, Jannetta Mayson Redding, died during her college years. Louis Redding was married twice. He had three daughters—Ann, Rupa, and Judith—with his first wife Ruth Albert Cook Redding. After they divorced he married Gwendolyn Carmen Kiah.

See also
List of first minority male lawyers and judges in Delaware

References

Further reading
The African American Registry:Louis Redding, a Delaware legend!
Diamonds of Delaware and Maryland's Eastern Shore: Seven Black Men of Distinction
Louis L. Redding honored with endowed professorship
Woolard-Provine, Annette. Integrating Delaware : the Reddings of Wilmington. London, University of Delaware Press, 2003.

Delaware lawyers
University of Delaware people
Brown University alumni
Harvard Law School alumni
Activists for African-American civil rights
1901 births
1998 deaths
American civil rights lawyers
20th-century American lawyers